Mina Hashemi is an Iranian former footballer who played as a forward. She has been a member of the Iran women's national team.

References 

Living people
Iranian women's footballers
Women's association football forwards
Iran women's international footballers
Year of birth missing (living people)